The 2009 Copa de la Reina is the 27th edition of the competition, taking place between May 24 and June 21, 2009. The final was held in La Romareda, in Zaragoza.

Qualified teams

Results

Quarter finals

|}

Semifinals

|}

Final

External links
Copa de la Reina on Futbolme.com

Copa de la Reina
Women
2008-09